Uzor is a surname. Notable people with the surname include:

Edwin C.O. Uzor, Nigerian politician
Ched Uzor, English Love Island contestant

See also

Surnames of African origin